Əlikənd or Alikend or Alykend or Alikand or Allykend may refer to:
Əlikənd, Goychay
Allykend, Kalbajar
Əlikənd, Ujar